Broer Doekele (B.D.) Dykstra (November 21, 1871 - March 29, 1955) was a Dutch American pastor, educator, and poet who wrote several books, served as editor of the Volksvriend Dutch-language newspaper, and was a visible member of the Reformed Church in America.  Known in the RCA as "the man on the bicycle," he operated a small publishing house with his sons and traveled door-to-door to sell his books.

Dykstra was born "Broer Dijkstra" in Pingjum, Friesland in 1871, son of Doekele Dijkstra and Beitske van der Schaaf. The family emigrated to the United States in 1882. He became an avid pacifist.  He was a student at Orange City Academy, now Northwestern College in the late 19th century; today, the school offers the Dykstra-Muste-Nelson Peace Scholarship in his, A.J. Muste's, and Ronald R. Nelson's honor.  He died in Orange City, Iowa, United States, in 1955.

Several of his sons became prominent educators and theologians.  D. Ivan Dykstra was a professor of philosophy at Hope College, Wesley C. Dykstra held the same position at Alma College, and Vergil Dykstra served as president of George Mason University.

Books by Dykstra 
Ten Eeuwigen Vrede or For Everlasting Peace, 1937
Door Californië Per Fiets in 1936 or Through California by Bicycle, 1939
Geloof en Leven or Belief and Life, 1941
Korte Gedichten or Short Poems

See also
 List of peace activists

References

External links
Northwestern College
Joint Archives of Holland
goDutch.com

1871 births
1955 deaths
American pacifists
American male writers
American people of Frisian descent
Calvinist pacifists
Dutch emigrants to the United States
Reformed Church in America members
People from Wûnseradiel